KXEA (104.9 FM, "104.9 The Bizz") is an American radio station licensed to serve Lowry City, Missouri, United States. The station is owned by Clayton and Brittany Radford and the broadcast license is held by Radford Media Group, LLC.

KXEA broadcasts a hot adult contemporary format to the west-central Missouri area.

The station was assigned the call sign KXEA by the Federal Communications Commission (FCC) on February 25, 2010.

On December 30, 2018 KXEA rebranded as "Rock 104.9".

On January 6, 2023 KXEA changed their format from classic rock to hot adult contemporary, branded as "104.9 The Bizz".

Previous logo
 (KXEA's logo under former classic hits format)

References

External links

XEA
Hot adult contemporary radio stations in the United States
St. Clair County, Missouri
Radio stations established in 2010
2010 establishments in Missouri